Moritz Heinrich (born 3 July 1997) is a German footballer who plays as a winger for  club SpVgg Bayreuth.

Club career
On 12 June 2019, Heinrich joined SpVgg Unterhaching on a two-year contract.

Ahead of the 2021–22 season, he moved to recently relegated Würzburger Kickers. He made 22 league appearances throughout the season, as the club suffered relegation again. Heinrich left the club after one year.

On 22 June 2022, Heinrich joined recently promoted 3. Liga club SpVgg Bayreuth.

References

External links
 
 

1997 births
Living people
Footballers from Munich
German footballers
Germany youth international footballers
Association football wingers
TSV 1860 Munich II players
SC Preußen Münster players
SpVgg Unterhaching players
Würzburger Kickers players
SpVgg Bayreuth players
Regionalliga players
3. Liga players